is a Japanese female rugby union player. She represents Japan in rugby sevens and made her debut at the 2016 São Paulo Women's Sevens. She was named in Japan's women's sevens team to the 2016 Summer Olympics.

References

External links 
 Japan Player Profile
 

Olympic rugby sevens players of Japan
People from Higashiōsaka
Japanese rugby sevens players
Japan international women's rugby sevens players
1995 births
Living people
Rugby sevens players at the 2016 Summer Olympics
Rugby sevens players at the 2020 Summer Olympics